Christopher Packe may refer to:

Sir Christopher Packe (politician) (c. 1599–1682), appointed Lord Packe under the Protectorate 
Christopher Packe (chemist) (b. in or before 1657, d. in or after 1708), chemical physician  
Christopher Packe (physician and cartographer) (1686–1749), medical doctor and geologist who produced the first geological map of Southern England
Christopher Packe (painter) (1760–1840), portrait and landscape painter